Herman Hurmevaara (Russian Герман Вильгельмович Хурмеваара, German Vilgelmovich Khurmevaara; 19 February 1886 – 16 February 1938) was a Finnish Social Democratic Party of Finland Member of Parliament. He was born in Kiuruvesi, and served in the Parliament of Finland from 1917 to 1919. In the 1920s, he lived in Sweden. In 1930, he was exiled from Sweden, and with his family he moved to the Soviet Union. During the Great Purge, Hurmevaara was arrested on charges of espionage and imprisoned on December 23, 1937. He was later sentenced to death and executed by firing squad in Petrozavodsk. After the death of Joseph Stalin, he was rehabilitated in 1956.

Sources
 
 

1886 births
1938 deaths
People from Kiuruvesi
People from Kuopio Province (Grand Duchy of Finland)
Social Democratic Party of Finland politicians
Communist Party of Finland politicians
Members of the Parliament of Finland (1917–19)
People of the Finnish Civil War (Red side)
Great Purge victims from Finland
People executed by the Soviet Union
Soviet rehabilitations
Finnish emigrants to the Soviet Union
Finnish exiles
Finnish expatriates in Sweden